Operation Hawthorn was the codename for a series of British Commando raids on Sardinia during the Second World War. The raids between June and July 1943 were carried out by L Detachment Special Boat Squadron. The raiders were landed either by parachute or submarine and most of those who landed were killed or captured and the detachment had to be reconstituted.

References

Conflicts in 1943
World War II British Commando raids
Special Air Service
History of Sardinia
1943 in Italy